Prince Balthasar Charles With a Dwarf is a 1631 portrait by Diego Velázquez of Balthasar Charles, Prince of Asturias and a court dwarf. It is now in the Museum of Fine Arts in Boston. It is the first of several portraits Velázquez painted of the young prince.

The prince is shown in the uniform of a captain-general (adapted to his infant state but still including a commander's baton in his right hand, a shoulder sash and a sword hilt in his left hand). The dwarf holds an apple and a rattle, to contrast with the heir to the most powerful monarchy in Europe, who is shown as already in military training and not needing these usual children's attributes. The prince's static posture, in contrast to the dynamism of the dwarf's figure, turning to contemplate the prince, has caused some art historians to think that the painting was originally only of the prince, with the dwarf added later.

References

External links 
 Museum of Fine Arts, Boston.org: Don Baltasar Carlos with a Dwarf
 Metropolitan Museum of Art catalog from the Velázquez exhibition — online as PDF, with material on this painting (see index).
 Portal Artehistoria: información del cuadro—

Portraits by Diego Velázquez in the Museum of Fine Arts, Boston
1631 paintings
17th-century portraits
Portraits of men
1630s in Spain
Portraits by Diego Velázquez
Paintings of children